Mount Kilimanjaro is a volcano in Tanzania and the highest mountain in Africa.

Kilimanjaro may also refer to:

Tanzania
 Kilimanjaro National Park comprises the whole of Mount Kilimanjaro above the tree line and six forest corridors stretching down
 Kilimanjaro Region, a region in Tanzania
 Kilimanjaro (ward), a ward in the Moshi Urban district of Kilimanjaro Region, Tanzania
 Kilimanjaro International Airport in Tanzania
 a Tanzanian beer, see Beer in Africa#Eastern Africa
 a Tanzanite jewellery brand owned by F. Hinds

Music
 Killamanjaro, a Jamaican reggae sound system

Albums
 Kilimanjaro, an album by German artist Superpitcher
 Kilimanjaro (The Rippingtons album), a 1988 album by The Rippingtons
 Kilimanjaro (The Teardrop Explodes album), an album by The Teardrop Explodes

Songs
 "Kilimanjaro", song by The Del Vikings	1962
 "Kilimanjaro", song by Manhattan Brothers 1955
 "Kilimanjaro", song by The Teardrop Explodes 1980
 "Kilimanjaro", song by Juluka 1984
 "Kilimandjaro" (song), a 1966  French-language song by French singer Pascal Danel
 "Kilimanjaro" (song), a 2010 song by A.R. Rahman from the film Enthiran
 "Kilimanjaro", a song by KSI from the 2016 extended play Keep Up

Film
 Kilimanjaro (film), a 2013 American film

Nigeria
 Kilimanjaro restaurant, a fast-food chain in Nigeria.

See also
 The Snows of Kilimanjaro (disambiguation)